The Territory of Curaçao national football team (more commonly known as Curaçao) was the official football team for the Territory of Curaçao, under the control of the Curaçaose Voetbal Bond (CVB).

The Territory of Curaçao officially became the Netherlands Antilles on 15 December 1954 although the national football team played under the name of Curaçao until 1958.

History

Getting organized

In 1921 the football federation CVB (Curacaose Voetbal Bond) was established and in August that year the CVB organized the first Curaçao Championship with eight participating clubs. In 1926 the first national selection of Curaçao travelled to Haiti to play in a tournament against Haiti, Jamaica and  Santo Domingo. The Curaçao selection did quite well in the tournament, with several wins over Haiti and Santo Domingo.

In 1932 the federation CVB  became affiliated with FIFA.  Exchanges with neighboring islands and countries followed on a regular basis. In 1941 the First CCCF Championship took place in San José. Participating countries were Costa Rica, Curaçao, Nicaragua, El Salvador and Panama. Curaçao ended third.

At the end of this year the Curaçao and Aruba federations, both islands being part of the Netherlands Antilles, decided to join forces and established NAVU, Netherlands Antillean Football Union. Both federations remained autonomous in their own territory, and the winners of the championships on the respective islands would play against each other to determine which club would be Champion of the Netherlands Antilles.

Early years

Curaçao is a small Caribbean island located just north of the Venezuelan coast. Curaçao is part of the Kingdom of the Netherlands, as are the islands Aruba, Bonaire, Sint Maarten, Sint Eustatius and Saba, together known as the former Netherlands Antilles. Curaçao has about 150,000 inhabitants.

In 1909 the first football club was established in Curaçao, then counting about 25.000 inhabitants, established in 1909, CVV Republic. Young people who had spent time in the Netherlands for study and had started playing football and taken a liking to the game united in CVV Republic. At the time there were no soccer fields on Curaçao and the first match between CVV Republic and a team of marines took place in the garden of the church of Sta. Famia. As a matter of fact, the Friars, who also ran the schools, played an important role in the early stages of soccer development as they propagated the sport and also organized volunteers to clean and prepare the first fields in Skalo and Mundo.

"Golden Years"

In May 1946 CVB celebrated its 25 years of existence with an international tournament on Curaçao. Visiting teams were Aruba, Suriname, Atlético Junior from Colombia and Feyenoord from the Netherlands. Curaçao won all their matches and the last match against the famous Dutch team Feyenoord attracted a large number of spectators. Curaçao won 4–0. In July 1946 the national selection of Curaçao travelled to the Netherlands to reinforce the bond between Curaçao and the Netherlands. During their three-month stay the Curaçao selection played 9 matches against Dutch teams of which the 3–3 draw against Feyenoord, one of the big Dutch teams, is vividly remembered. The stadium in Rotterdam was filled with over 37.000 spectators, almost as much as the inhabitants of Curaçao at the time! The young Curaçao goalkeeper Ergilio Hato made a lasting impression with his great athletic abilities and amazing jumping power.

The Curaçao national selection performed very well in the CCCF and the Central American and Caribbean Games, even winning the gold medal in 1950 in the CAC Games.  Ergilio Hato became a legend in South America and the Caribbean and is remembered by his nickname "El pantera negra".  He got offered several contracts abroad but refused to go pro and choose to stay on his native island. The national stadium of Curaçao is named Ergilio Hato Stadium. 1958 brought another organizational change with the establishment of NAVU, the Netherlands Antilles Football Union. Soon the Aruban AVB affiliated with NAVU and BVB, the Bonaire Football Federation followed in 1959. Now players from the three islands could all participate in the national selection of the Netherlands Antilles. Driving force behind both NAVU and FFK is Mordy Maduro, president of CVB since 1951 and president of NAVU from 1958–1971. Maduro was elected vice-president of FIFA in 1960 and re-elected in 1968. Thanks to Mordy Maduro many foreign teams visited Curaçao during his presidency. His great contribution to Curaçao football development was honored in 2002 with naming the NAVU development center after him.

Another remarkable success in the football history of Curaçao is the Curaçao team CRKSV Jong Colombia reaching the finals of the 1979 CONCACAF Champions' Cup. After nine matches the team lost the final 7–1 against the El Salvador team C.D. FAS.

Competitive record

FIFA World Cup

CCCF Championship

Olympic Games

Pan American Games

Central American and Caribbean Games

''*Team entered under the Netherlands Antilles name as they were representing the Netherlands Antilles Olympic Committee

Notes

References 

Curaçao national football team